The 2019 Central American Cricket Championship was a cricket tournament held in Mexico from 25 to 28 April 2019. It was the seventh edition of the Central American Championship and the first since the ICC granted Twenty20 International (T20I) status to matches between all of its Members.

Men's championship
The five participating teams were the national sides of Belize, Costa Rica, Mexico and Panama, as well as a side representing the MCC. The matches were played at the Reforma Athletic Club in the city of Naucalpan, just to the northwest of Mexico City. All participating nations made their T20I debuts during the tournament (matches involving the MCC did not have T20I status). MCC were the defending champions, but were defeated by five wickets in the final by Belize.

Squads

Points table
{| class="wikitable" style="text-align:center"
|-
! style="width:175px;"|Team
! style="width:20px;"|
! style="width:20px;"|
! style="width:20px;"|
! style="width:20px;"|
! style="width:20px;"|
! style="width:20px;"|
! style="width:65px;"|
|- style="background:#cfc;"
| style="text-align:left" | MCC 
| 4 || 4 || 0 || 0 || 0 || 8 || +1.893 
|- style="background:#cfc;"
| style="text-align:left" | 
| 4 || 3 || 1 || 0 || 0 || 6 || +1.192
|- 
| style="text-align:left" | 
| 4 || 2 || 2 || 0 || 0 || 4 || +0.346
|- 
| style="text-align:left" | 
| 4 || 1 || 3 || 0 || 0 || 2 || –1.182
|- 
| style="text-align:left" | 
| 4 || 0 || 4 || 0 || 0 || 0 || –2.255
|}

Round-robin stage

Final

Women's championship
A women's championship, consisting of a three-match series between Mexico and Costa Rica, took place alongside the men's event. The final match of the series was played at the Reforma Athletic Club ahead of the men's final. The first two matches had Women's Twenty20 International (WT20I) status.

Squads

Matches

References

External links
 Championships home at Cricclubs.com
 Men's Series home at ESPN Cricinfo
 Women's Series home at ESPN Cricinfo

International cricket competitions in 2018–19
Twenty20 International cricket competitions
International cricket competitions in Mexico
2019 in Mexican sports